Dolichoderus fernandezi is a species of ant in the genus Dolichoderus. Described by Mackay in 1993, the species is only known in Colombia.

References

Dolichoderus
Hymenoptera of South America
Insects described in 1993